Phymatolithon is a genus of non geniculate coralline red algae, known from the UK, and Australia.  It is encrusting, flat, and unbranched; it has tetrasporangia and bisporangia borne in multiporate conceptacles. Some of its cells bear small holes in the middle; this distinctive thallus texture is termed a "Leptophytum-type" thallus surface, and has been posited as a taxonomically informative character. It periodically sloughs off its epithallus, reducing its overgrowth by algae by as much as 50% compared to bare rock.

References

Red algae genera
Corallinales